Ñauña (possibly from Quechua for arête) is a mountain in the Andes of Peru, about  high. It is located in the Cusco Region, Canchis Province, Pitumarca District, near the Vilcanota mountain range. Ñauña lies on a ridge between the rivers Chillcamayu and Yanamayu. It is situated northeast of the peak of Queullacocha and the lake of the same name.

References

Mountains of Cusco Region
Mountains of Peru